SPIE Gold Medal, or Gold Medal Award of SPIE, is the highest honor of SPIE (the international society for optics and photonics), and is considered one of the highest award in the fields of photonic and optical engineering and related instrumental sciences. The Gold Medal started awarding annually since 1977, and the award includes a medal and $10,000 cash award.

Past awardees

See also

 List of engineering awards

References

External links
 

Awards of SPIE